Caylin A. Young (born October 18, 1987) is an American politician. He is a member of the Maryland House of Delegates for District 45 in Baltimore City. He previously served as the public policy director of the American Civil Liberties Union of Maryland.

Background
Young graduated from Hampton University with a Bachelor's degree in mathematics. He later attended the University of Baltimore School of Law, where he earned his Juris Doctor degree.

Young interned for the Maryland Court of Appeals, served as a legal fellow to U.S. Senator Cory Booker, and was a legislative assistant for former state senator Nathaniel J. McFadden and former state delegate Cheryl Glenn. He also served as the legislative director for then-Baltimore City Council president Brandon Scott.

In 2018, Young unsuccessfully ran for the Maryland House of Delegates in District 45, coming in fourth place with 12.1 percent of the vote.

In December 2019, Young applied to fill a vacancy in the Maryland House of Delegates to serve the rest of the term of state delegate Cheryl Glenn, who resigned and pleaded guilty to federal corruption charges. In January 2020, the Baltimore City Democratic Central Committee voted to nominate Chanel Branch to the seat, with Young placing second behind Branch. After the controversial vote, Young sought legal advice to challenge the results, arguing that succession votes have traditionally required four votes, whereas Branch got three.

In January 2021, the American Civil Liberties Union of Maryland hired Young to serve as its public policy director. He left the ACLU in December to serve as the deputy director for the Baltimore City Office of Equity and Civil Rights.

In 2022, Young ran for the Maryland House of Delegates in District 45, running on a ticket with state senator Cory V. McCray and Jackie Addison, a community activist. He won the Democratic primary on July 19, narrowly defeating incumbent state delegate Chanel Branch by 116 votes.

In the legislature
Young was sworn into the Maryland House of Delegates on January 11, 2023. He is a member of the House Judiciary Committee.

Electoral history

References

External links
 

1987 births
21st-century African-American politicians
21st-century American politicians
African-American state legislators in Maryland
American Civil Liberties Union people
Democratic Party members of the Maryland House of Delegates
Living people
University of Baltimore School of Law alumni
Hampton University alumni